Tonya Williams (born July 12, 1958) is a Canadian actress, producer, and activist. Sometimes credited as Tonya Lee Williams, she is best known for her role as Dr. Olivia Barber Winters on the American daytime drama The Young and the Restless from 1990 to 2005 and 2007 to 2012. She is the founder and executive director of Reelworld Film Festival.

Early life
Williams was born in London, England to Jamaican parents. She lived in London and Kingston, Jamaica as a young child. At age five, she contracted rheumatic fever; she and her mother then moved to Birmingham. In 1969 she and her family settled in Oshawa, Ontario, Canada. As a teenager she modeled in Eaton's catalogues and danced on a television series called Boogie! which ran on Citytv. In 1977 Williams was crowned Miss Black Ontario.

Williams was married to Robert Simpson from 1983 to 1991, but she has never remarried.

Career
Williams' television debut was as a host of the Canadian children's show Polka Dot Door, from 1980 to 1983, after graduating from Ryerson Polytechnical Institute in 1979. Appearances on the television series Check it Out! and Generations followed. Her involvement on Generations snagged her a role on The Young and the Restless, and has become her most lucrative role. Williams won the NAACP Image Award for Outstanding Actress in a Daytime Drama Series in 2000 and 2002.

Williams appeared on A Very Brady Christmas as Cindy's roommate.

In March 2004, Williams hosted the special event program Tonya Lee Williams: Gospel Jubilee on CBC Television. She is a member of Sigma Gamma Rho sorority.

Williams is the founder, executive and artistic director of the Reelworld Film Festival, an annual film festival in Toronto that features talent from ethnically diverse communities.

Filmography

Film and television appearances

Executive producer

Director

Writer

Awards and nominations
 1996: Daytime Emmy Award for Outstanding Supporting Actress in a Drama Series –  Nomination
 1996: NAACP Image Award for Outstanding Actress in a Daytime Drama Series – Nomination
 1997: NAACP Image Award for Outstanding Actress in a Daytime Drama Series – Nomination
 1998: NAACP Image Award for Outstanding Actress in a Daytime Drama Series – Nomination
 1999: NAACP Image Award for Outstanding Actress in a Daytime Drama Series – Nomination
 2000: Daytime Emmy Award for Outstanding Supporting Actress in a Drama Series – Nomination
 2000: NAACP Image Award for Outstanding Actress in a Daytime Drama Series – Win
 2001: NAACP Image Award for Outstanding Actress in a Daytime Drama Series – Nomination
 2002: NAACP Image Award for Outstanding Actress in a Daytime Drama Series – Win
 2003: NAACP Image Award for Outstanding Actress in a Daytime Drama Series – Nomination
 2004: NAACP Image Award for Outstanding Actress in a Daytime Drama Series – Nomination
 2005: NAACP Image Award for Outstanding Actress in a Daytime Drama Series – Nomination
 2005: ACTRA National Award of Excellence
 2006: NAACP Image Award for Outstanding Actress in a Daytime Drama Series – Nomination
 2009: NAACP Image Award for Outstanding Actress in a Daytime Drama Series – Nomination
 2010: NAACP Image Award for Outstanding Actress in a Daytime Drama Series – Nomination
 2011: NAACP Image Award for Outstanding Actress in a Daytime Drama Series – Nomination
 2012: NAACP Image Award for Outstanding Actress in a Daytime Drama Series – Nomination
 2012: Martin Luther King Jr. Achievement Award for her film and television artistic contributions.
2012: Top 25 Canadian Immigrant Award Winner

References

External links
Tonya Lee Williams: Gospel Jubilee, from cbc.ca

1958 births
Black Canadian actresses
Canadian film actresses
Canadian soap opera actresses
Canadian television actresses
English emigrants to Canada
Canadian people of Jamaican descent
Canadian expatriates in England
Living people
Actresses from London
Actresses from Oshawa
Toronto Metropolitan University alumni
Film festival founders